The highland shiner (Notropis micropteryx) is a species of ray-finned fish in the genus Notropis. It is endemic to the United States where it is found in tributaries of the Green, Cumberland, and Tennessee rivers in southern Kentucky, northern Alabama, Virginia, and western North Carolina.

References 

 

Notropis
Fish described in 1868